Radiesthesia describes an ability to detect radiation emitted by a person, animal, object or geographical feature.  There is no scientific evidence of the existence of this pseudoscientific or occult phenomenon.

Definitions
One definition is "sensitivity to radiations of all kinds emanating from living beings, inanimate objects, mineral ores, water and even photographs"

The word derives from Latin root ‘radi-’ referring to beams of light, radiation and ‘aesthesia’, referring to sensory perception.

The term is a neologism created by a French Catholic priest Alexis Timothée Bouly who was a celebrated dowsing practitioner in the early part of the 20th century. Bouly claimed to be able to detect unexploded ordnance from WW1 and also to detect molecular changes in laboratory experiments.  He was the founder at Lille in 1929 of the Association of the Friends of Radiesthesia.

Claims
Practitioners may claim to be able to detect the emitted radiation through use of their hands or more typically with dowsing rods or a pendulum.

Teleradiesthesia or Tele-radiesthesia describes this sensitivity to radiation but without the need to be in physical proximity to the subject.  Typically a practitioner will use an instrument such as a pendulum to perform analysis based on a map or photograph.

The practical application of radiesthesia, i.e. dowsing is directed toward providing individual and environmental benefits, such as:
 diagnosis of infirmities
 detection of underground water
 detection of underground mineral sources
 detection of the Earth's telluric currents and magnetic fields
 location of lost objects
 location of missing persons or livestock

A distinction may be made in the application of radiesthesic  techniques in the detection of physical phenomena e.g. water, minerals, objects, changed cell condition and using these techniques for analysis of supposed subtle energy fields or the ‘aura’ of an individual.

Researchers have cited an involuntary bodily reaction, that is, ideomotor phenomenon as the initiator of the movement seen occurring in instruments such as dowsing rods or a pendulum. It is this reactive movement which typically acts as the indicator of the location of the state change of the subject or object under investigation.

See also 
 Geobiology (pseudoscience)
 List of topics characterised as pseudoscience
 Radionics
 Rhabdomancy

References

Further reading 
 F.A. Archdale Elementary Radiesthesia and the Use of the Pendulum, 1950 
 Marc Aurice, Le Grand Livre de la radiesthésie, 2008 éditions Trédaniel 
 Gabriell Blackburn, Science and Art of the Pendulum: A Complete Course in Radiesthesia, 1984 pub. Idylwild 
 C.L. Cooper-Hunt, Radiesthetic Analysis, 1996 pub. Health Research Books 
 Bruce Copen, Dowsing from Maps, Tele-radiesthesia, 1975 pub. Academic Publications 
 Emma Decourtay, Initiation à la radiesthésie, 2004 éditions Cristal 
 Gilbert Degueldre, La Radiesthésie, cet instinct originel, 1985 éditions Florikosse asbl, Verviers – Belgique 
 Karl Maximilan Fischer, Radiästhesie und Geopathie – Theorie und empirische Untersuchungen, 1989 Böhlau in Wien 
 Christopher Freeland, Radiesthesia I – Method and Training for the Modern Dowser, 2020 pub. Completelynovel 
 Tom Graves, Pendel und Wünschelrute, Radiästhesie, 1999 
 Jane E. Hartman, Radionics and Radiesthesia, 1999 pub Aquarian Systems 
 Ray Hyman. How People Are Fooled by Ideomotor Action.
 Adolphe Landspurg, Comment devenir sourcier et géobiologue (La pratique de la radiesthésie vibratoire), 2003 éditions Dangles 
 Hartmut Lüdeling: Handbuch der Radiaesthesie – Schwerpunkt Grifflängentechnik. 2006 Drachen-Verlag 
 Marguerite Maury, How to Dowse – Experimental And Practical Radiesthesia 1953, pub. G. Bell and Sons; 2008 edition 
 Alexis Mermet, Principles and Practice of Radiesthesia: A textbook for Practitioners and Students, 1959; 1991 edition 
 Michel Moine, La radiestesia – la otra sciencia, 1974 
 Helmut Müller, Radiestesia: Manual Práctico, 1991 Editorial De Vecchi 
 Otto Prokop, Wolf Wimmer: Wünschelrute, Erdstrahlen, Radiästhesie. Die okkulten Strahlenfühligkeitslehren im Lichte der Wissenschaft. 1985 Thieme  
 Jessie Toler Kingsley Tarpey, Healing by radiesthesia, 1955, pub. Omega Press 
 Henry Tomlinson, The Divination of Disease: A Study in Radiesthesia, 1953 pub. Health Science Press 
 S.W. Tromp, Psychical Physics, a Scientific Analysis of Dowsing, Radiesthesia and Kindred Phenomena, 1949 pub. Elzevier, New York 
 Herbet Weaver, Divining, the Primary Sense: Unfamiliar Radiation in Nature, Art and Science, 1978 pub,  Routledge & Kegan Paul 
 V. D. Wethered, A Radiesthetic Approach to Health and Homoeopathy, or Health and the Pendulum, 1950, pub. British Society of Dowsers 
 V. D. Wethered, An Introduction to Medical Radiesthesia and Radionics, 1957 pub. C.W. Daniel Company

External links 
 Association des Amis de la Radiesthesie 
 Associazioni Italiana Radiestesisti 

Pseudoscience